Ethan C. Dizon is an American actor, best known for playing Pete in The Inevitable Defeat of Mister & Pete. His most recent role was the character Brian "Tiny" McKeever, Peter Parker's classmate in the Marvel Cinematic Universe films Spider-Man: Homecoming and Avengers: Infinity War.

Early life 
Ethan C. Dizon was born in 2002 in Los Angeles, California, to an American mother of Chinese descent and a Filipino father. He is the great-grandson of well-known World War II veteran and U.S. postmaster Lim Poon Lee, and the grand-nephew of Chinese actress Chow Kwun-Ling. His mother is actress Corinne Chooey, and his two younger brothers are also actors.

Career 
In 2008, Dizon made his acting debut in the CBS comedy series How I Met Your Mother. He played a guest role in the series 'Til Death in 2009, and in the medical drama Grey's Anatomy in 2012. He also played the title role in the short film Paulie.

In 2013, Dizon starred as Pete in the drama The Inevitable Defeat of Mister & Pete along with Skylan Brooks, Anthony Mackie and Jennifer Hudson; the film was directed by George Tillman Jr. The film was released on October 11, 2013 by Lionsgate Entertainment, and Dizon was highly praised by media and film critics. He also played the role of Ricky Irvine in the comedy-drama Bad Words.

Dizon played the role of Kwan in the comedy Get a Job, which was released in 2016.

In 2018, he attended the intensive California State Summer School for the Arts (CSSSA) as both a theater major and a member of Studio 5. While he has not acted since, except for a new production of Sammy Joins the Mafia mounted via Zoom, he is still active in the industry and looking for new roles.

Filmography

Film

Television

References

External links 
 

Living people
2002 births
American male child actors
American male film actors
American male television actors
American male actors of Chinese descent
Male actors from Los Angeles
21st-century American male actors
American people of Filipino descent